Spetchley railway station was an intermediate stop on the Birmingham and Gloucester Railway, opened in 1840. Besides the village of Spetchley, it served the city of Worcester until 1850. It closed to passengers in 1855 but remained open for goods until 1961.

History
It was considered to be a "First class" station – all trains called.

The station buildings originally cost £2,716 but extensions and modifications before opening added a further £572. They were built in the Gothic style. Facilities included offices, houses for some of the staff, stables for ten horses, waiting rooms and a refreshment room. The refreshment room was not operated by the railway, but leased out.

A coaching office was opened opposite the HopPole in Worcester. Coaches carried 13 passengers, and 40 minutes were allowed for the journey. The coaches proved costly to the B&GR (in 1844, 78,372 passengers were carried at a cost to the B&GR of £2,698), and they drew many complaints.

The B&GR amalgamated with the Bristol and Gloucester Railway early in 1845, forming the Bristol and Birmingham Railway (B&BR); the Midland Railway (MR) leased the B&BR later in 1845 and absorbed it in 1846.

The first section of the Oxford, Worcester and Wolverhampton Railway (OW&WR), between Abbotswood Junction (on the Midland Railway) and Worcester, opened on 5 October 1850. This route was worked by the MR, and the road coaches between Spetchley and Worcester were withdrawn at the same time. This line was extended north to Stoke Prior Junction (also on the MR) on 18 February 1852, and both of these sections of the OW&WR were then treated by the MR as a loop off their main line.

Spetchley station closed to passengers on 1 October 1855. In 1904 it had facilities for handling goods and livestock; it closed to all traffic on 2 January 1961.

, an Up Goods Loop still exists at Spetchley, beginning  and ending  from Derby (London Road Junction).

References

Further reading

Disused railway stations in Worcestershire
Former Midland Railway stations
Railway stations in Great Britain opened in 1840
Railway stations in Great Britain closed in 1855